In Greek mythology, Hyperion ('the high one') may refer to two different characters:

 Hyperion, one of the Titans and father of Helios, Selene and Eos by his sister-wife Theia.
 Hyperion, a Trojan prince as one of the sons of King Priam of Troy by an unknown woman.

Notes

References 

 Apollodorus, The Library with an English Translation by Sir James George Frazer, F.B.A., F.R.S. in 2 Volumes, Cambridge, MA, Harvard University Press; London, William Heinemann Ltd. 1921. ISBN 0-674-99135-4. Online version at the Perseus Digital Library. Greek text available from the same website.
 Hesiod, Theogony from The Homeric Hymns and Homerica with an English Translation by Hugh G. Evelyn-White, Cambridge, MA.,Harvard University Press; London, William Heinemann Ltd. 1914. Online version at the Perseus Digital Library. Greek text available from the same website.

Characters in Greek mythology